Kentucky Splash Waterpark is an amusement park which includes a waterpark, miniature golf course, driving range and campground  in  Williamsburg, Kentucky.

External links
 

Water parks in Kentucky
Buildings and structures in Whitley County, Kentucky
Tourist attractions in Whitley County, Kentucky
2001 establishments in Kentucky